Michael Stanton Jeffries (born ) is an American businessman who served as CEO of clothing retailer Abercrombie & Fitch from 1992 to 2014. During Jeffries' tenure, Abercrombie & Fitch grew from a "fashion backwater" losing $25 million yearly to a lifestyle brand grossing $2 billion yearly by 2006. Despite Jeffries' success, he received significant criticism for using semi-nude models in his company's advertising, selling clothes with racially and sexually off-color slogans, and his candid stance that Abercrombie & Fitch markets solely to the "cool kids."

Early life
Jeffries grew up in Los Angeles, the son of Donald R. Jeffries, who owned a chain of party supply stores. Jeffries attended Claremont Men's College and the London School of Economics before receiving an MBA from Columbia Business School in 1968. In 1971, Jeffries married Susan Hansen, and they have a grown son.

Career

Early career

Jeffries began his career in the fashion industry in the early 1970s. He started out working as a salesperson for the clothing retailer Paul Harris Stores in Nashville, Tennessee.

In 1968, Jeffries joined the management training program at Abraham & Straus, a now-defunct New York City department store. During this time Jeffries worked along with Allen Questrom (of J.C. Penney) and Mickey  Drexler (the previous CEO of Gap Inc., who now works at J. Crew).

In 1984, Jeffries founded Alcott & Andrews, a brand targeted at career women. The brand was initially successful, but in 1989 it fell into bankruptcy due to overexpansion, and closed. Afterward, Jeffries took a position at Paul Harris, a Midwest clothing chain.

In the early 1990s, Jeffries was hired as the CEO of the clothing brand Guess.

Abercrombie & Fitch Co.

Jeffries was hired in 1992 by Les Wexner (CEO of LBrands, then named The Limited) to invigorate Abercrombie & Fitch. The company, founded in 1892, had been purchased by Limited Brands in 1988 after bankruptcy. Jeffries is considered to have been the main creator of the new look for the company.

It was rebuilt as an upscale apparel retailer for the collegiate, and by the mid-1990s, Abercrombie & Fitch had opened dozens of new stores. By 1996, LBrands was no longer heavily involved with the company, and eventually left it under the management of Jeffries.

During this time, A&F has attracted controversy from different groups such as the feminist movement and the American Decency Association, and a number of lawsuits. An outspoken businessman, Jeffries has been quoted making statements in the press that can be considered controversial. Such comments include his assertion that "We hire good-looking people in our stores. Because good-looking people attract other good-looking people, and we want to market to cool, good-looking people. We don't market to anyone other than that."

In 2004, he made approximately $25 million USD with a "stay bonus" of US$6 million, which dropped from $12 million after a controversy involving his "excessive compensation". After surveying 2,000 US corporations, the Corporate Library named Jeffries as the "Highest Paid Worst Performer" of 2008, after he received a compensation package valued at $71.8 million. Jeffries refused to lower prices or offer discounts at Abercrombie & Fitch stores during the retail recession until September 2009, after the company posted same store sales losses for 17 consecutive months. Jeffries' employment agreement was set to expire December 31, 2008. On December 22, 2008, A&F corporate announced that it had been renewed. It expired on February 22, 2014.

After a slump in 2008 due to the financial crisis of 2007–2008, sales recovered in 2011. His total compensation in 2011 was estimated at $46,609,075, most of this being in the form of stock options.

, Jeffries owned about 2.9% of the company's shares, making him difficult to remove without his consent. At that time, his recent contract called for a payout of over one hundred million dollars should he lose his job due to an ownership change.

On December 9, 2013, it was reported Jeffries had agreed to a new contract with A&F that would tie his pay to company performance. Also in December, market commentator Herb Greenberg named Jeffries the worst CEO of 2013. Greenberg pointed out that the share price for Abercrombie and Fitch had collapsed by 40% during the year. This was after Jim Cramer of CNBC had earlier named Jeffries to his "Wall of Shame".

Jeffries was once one of the best-paid CEOs in retail but he saw his compensation shrink 72 percent in 2013. His total pay was $2.24 million in the fiscal year of 2013, which ended February 1. That was down from $8.16 million in the previous year and $48.1 million before that.

On December 9, 2014, Jeffries stepped down as A&F CEO amid mass criticism of the company's performance and 11 straight quarters of negative company comparable-store sales. The shares jumped 8 percent after the move was announced, marking the biggest one-day gain in more than nine months.

In 2022, Jeffries' leadership of A&F was the subject of a Netflix documentary, White Hot: The Rise & Fall of Abercrombie & Fitch, which focused on Jeffries' transformation of A&F into an "avatar of exclusivity and soft-core sex appeal." The film's focus is the buildup to a 2003 class-action lawsuit against the company.

Personal life
Salon.com has stated that Jeffries is a "gay man" and that he lives separately from his wife. As of 2013, Jeffries was reported to be living with his partner, Matthew Smith and three dogs. Smith headed the Jeffries Family Office, an Ohio limited liability corporation that "advocates for the personal interests of Abercrombie's CEO."  Smith also reviewed internal Abercrombie & Fitch documents and consulted on real estate matters. His involvement with Abercrombie & Fitch was criticized in some quarters as an example of poor corporate governance, since he held no official position in the company. Smith's presence was a factor in Jeffries being ousted as CEO of Abercrombie & Fitch in 2014.

Controversies
In a 2006 interview with Salon, Jeffries stated that his clothing line was exclusively for "cool" people. Moreover, he has said he did not want overweight or unattractive people to wear his clothes. The comments, which came to light in 2013, drew negative publicity and criticism for the company. Jeffries issued a public apology on May 15, 2013, stating that "We are completely opposed to any discrimination, bullying, derogatory characterizations or other anti-social behavior based on race, gender, body type or other individual characteristics".

In October 2012, Bloomberg News first reported on Jeffries' standards for his cabin crew on Abercrombie's Gulfstream G-V Jet, used by Jeffries, Smith and their dogs. The male models who work as stewards aboard the company jet were required to wear Abercrombie-branded polos, jeans, boxer briefs and flip-flops as part of their uniform, as well as a "spritz" of cologne. This information then came to light as a result of a lawsuit that claimed Jeffries fired his own jet pilot in order to replace him with a much younger man. The suit was quickly settled out of court when Jeffries was ordered to testify by the presiding judge. Male house staff for Jeffries, paid for by the Jeffries Family Office, were provided by the same modeling firm that supplies male staff for the company jet.

Further reading

References

External links

1944 births
Living people
Abercrombie & Fitch
Businesspeople from Los Angeles
Columbia Business School alumni
American retail chief executives
American LGBT businesspeople
LGBT people from California
LGBT people from Oklahoma
20th-century American businesspeople
21st-century American businesspeople
Gay businessmen
Businesspeople from Oklahoma
Claremont McKenna College alumni